"Chinatown" is a song performed by The Move.  Released in 1971, the song reached number 23 on the UK Singles Chart. Recorded at the same time as the band's alter-ego Electric Light Orchestra were laying down tracks for their first album. Former Move vocalist Carl Wayne claimed it was his favourite song by the band.

The B-side was a Jeff Lynne-penned song "Down on the Bay".

In the US, the single (with an edited version of "Chinatown") was issued on MGM, but quickly withdrawn (probably before regular stock copies were pressed, although yellow label promos have been seen). The single with the same edit was almost immediately issued on United Artists.

References

1971 songs
Song recordings produced by Jeff Lynne
Song recordings produced by Roy Wood
The Move songs
Songs written by Roy Wood
Harvest Records singles
United Artists Records singles